Abdelaziz Baraka Sakin (Arabic:عبد العزيز بركة ساكن, born in Kassala, Sudan, in 1963) is a Sudanese fiction writer with roots in Darfur in western Sudan, whose literary work was banned in Sudan in 2011. Since 2012, he has lived in exile in Austria. He is mostly known for his novels The Messiah of Darfur and The Jungo, translated from the original Arabic into French, English, Spanish and German.

According to Sudanese literary critic Lemya Shammat, "Sakin has repeatedly reflected on the complexity of human experience during conflict, reflecting the horrible mass of contradictions that war brings.”

Life and literary career

Baraka Sakin was born in the Sudanese town of Kassala near the border with Eritrea, but the roots of his family go back to Darfur in western Sudan. He graduated in business administration from the University of Assiut in Egypt, and has exercised different professional activities during his life: as manual worker, secondary school teacher, consultant for UNICEF in Darfur, or as employee of an international NGO for children’s rights.

His literary work, which speaks of marginalised people and war, with references to the Darfur genocide and the dictatorship in Sudan under Omar al-Bashir, is published in Arabic in Egypt. It is popular with Sudanese readers, who had been smuggling his books into their country after their interdiction in 2009. The Sudanese writer Ayman Bik called the novel The Messiah of Darfur "a great step forward, towards liberation from our historical ties with regards to the Darfur region, and regarding the systematic racism and the massacres committed in the region".

In 2011, Baraka Sakin received the Al-Tayeb Salih Prize for Creative Writing at the Khartoum book fair for his novel The Jungo – Stakes of the Earth, which deals with the conditions in a women's prison in El-Gadarif in eastern Sudan. Shortly after its release, the Sudanese authorities confiscated and banned his books. In 2012, Baraka Sakin left Sudan, seeking exile in Austria, where he has lived since 2012.

Translations and reception 
Following the original edition, his novel The Jungo – Stakes of the Earth was published in English and French translations. His short story A Woman from Kampo Kadees was included in the anthology Nouvelles du Soudan in 2010. The French translation of The Messiah of Darfur won the Prix Les Afriques in 2017. In France, he also published a children's book as a multilingual edition in Arabic, English and French.

Several of his short stories were translated into German by Sudanese-Austrian writer Ishraga Mustafa. In September 2016, he was invited to Berlin as participant of the International Festival for Literature, and in 2019 to the festival of African literature Crossing Borders in Cologne, Germany. His novel The Messiah of Darfur was published in a German translation in October 2021. In a review for the German online portal Qantara, fellow writer Volker Kaminski wrote about the novel:

Baraka Sakin was awarded the BBC Short Story Prize for the Arab World for A Woman from Kampo Kadees in 1993, and in 2020, the Arab Literature Prize by the Institut du Monde Arabe (IMA) in Paris for the French translation of his novel The Jungo – Stakes of the Earth. Commenting on this award, he said in an interview: "...this prize came at just the right time because my novel talks about religious tolerance, love and humanity, where we now live in a world torn apart by identity struggles, going through what looks like a clash of civilizations.”

Baraka Sakin has written for several Arabic-language magazines: Al Arabi magazine (Kuweit),  Al Naqid (London), Nazwa magazine (Oman), Journal of Palestinian Studies (Paris, in French), Doha Magazine (UAE), Banipal (London), or Dastoor newspaper (London).

At the end of August 2022, the Austrian city of Graz announced that Baraka Sakin had been nominated for its literary award Stadtschreiber von Graz (Town writer of Graz) for 2022/23. This award, for which 29 writers had currently applied, is intended to allow the prizewinners "to take a look at the city from the outside and to devote themselves to their further literary development." The jury explained the award with the following words: "In his novels, Abdelaziz Baraka Sakin proves himself to be an astute observer of socio-economic realities and, last but not least, a convincing analyst of myths and ideologies. The narrator counters the inauthenticity of technocratic regimes and abstruse irrationalism with irony, satire and black humour.”

Selected bibliography
(All original Arabic titles given in translation)
 Novels
The Mills, Vision Publishing, Cairo, 2000
The Water Ashes, Vision Publishing, Cairo, 2001
The Husband of the Bullet Woman and My Beautiful Daughter, Vision Publishing, Cairo, 2003
The Bedouin Lover, Vision Publishing, Cairo, 2010
The Jungo – Stakes of the Earth, Awraq Publishing House, Cairo, 2009
The Messiah of Darfur, Awraq Publishing House, Cairo, 2012 
The Kandarees, Awraq Publishing House, Cairo, 2012
Excuse me, Cairo, 2018
Slavers’ Banquets, 2020
Prayer of the Flesh, 2020 
Cloning of the Traitor, 2020

Short stories
 At the Peripheries of Sidewalks, Awraq Publishing House, Cairo, 2005
A Woman from Kampo Kadees, Awraq Publishing House, Cairo, 2005French translation: Une femme du camp de Kadis, in Nouvelles du Soudan, Magellan & Cie, 2010 English translation in Literary Sudans. An anthology of literature from Sudan and South Sudan, 2016
 The Daily remains of the Night, Awraq Publishing House, Cairo, 2010
 The Music of the Bones, Awraq Publishing House, Cairo, 2011

In English translation
 The Jungo: Stakes of the Earth. (2015). Africa World Press/The Red Sea Press, Inc., Trenton, NJ, USA.  
The Butcher's Daughter, in The Book of Khartoum, anthology of short stories, Comma Press, UK 2016
Birth (selected stories), independently published, 2020 

In French translation
Les Jango, Éditions Zulma, Paris, France, 2020, 
Le Messie du Darfour, Éditions Zulma, Paris, France, 2016, 

In German translation
Alkchandris: Wer hat Angst vor Osman Bushra? (short story) 2012
Der Messias von Darfur, Edition Orient, Berlin, 2021
In Spanish translation
 El Mesías de Darfur, Armænia

Literary awards 

 2011 Al-Tayeb-Salih Award for Creative Writing im Sudan
 2013 Stories on Air Prize, awarded by the BBC and Al Arabi Magazine
 2016 Prix du Live d’Humour de Resistance, awarded by La Maison du Rire et de l'Humour de Cluny, France
 2017 Prix Les Afriques, La Cène Littéraire, Switzerland
 2017 Prix Littérature-Monde, Academie française de Développement, France
 2020 Prix de la littérature arabe (Award for Arabic literature), Institut du Monde Arabe and Jean-Luc Lagardère Stiftung, France
 2022/23 Stadtschreiber von Graz, Austria

Further reading
 Al-Malik, A., Gaetano, S., Adam, H., Baraka, S. A., Karamallah, A., Mamoun, R., & Luffin, X. (2009). Nouvelles du Soudan. Paris: Magellan & Cie. 
 Cormack, Ralph and Shmookler, Max (eds.) (2016). The Book of Khartoum. A City in Short Fiction. 
 Banipal Magazine. Sudanese literature today. 2016
 
 Review of The Messiah of Darfur on Around the World in 180 Books, 2017

See also 
 Sudanese literature
 List of Sudanese writers
 Modern Arabic literature

References

External links 
Abdelaziz Baraka Sakin’s short story ‘A Veteran Warrior’, translated into English by Adil Babikir
Abdelaziz Baraka Sakin at Commapress publishers
Abdelaziz Baraka Sakin at goodreads

1963 births
Sudanese novelists
Sudanese male short story writers
Sudanese short story writers
Living people
21st-century Sudanese writers